Mala Gorica is a village in Croatia. The film The Fiddler on the Roof was partly filmed there. The film ends with the credit: "Our thanks to the people of the villages of Lekenik and Mala Gorica and the city of Zagreb, Yugoslavia."

References

Populated places in Sisak-Moslavina County